Sunnyledge (former McClelland House) at 5124 Fifth Avenue in the Shadyside neighborhood of Pittsburgh, Pennsylvania, was built in 1886.  It was designed by architects Longfellow & Harlow, and was originally the home and office of Dr. James H. McClelland.  McClelland was the founder of nearby Shadyside Hospital, now part of the University of Pittsburgh.  Members of the McClelland family remained residents of the home until the 1980s.  It is now the Sunnyledge Boutique Hotel and Tea Room.  It was added to the List of City of Pittsburgh historic designations on April 12, 1995.

References

Houses in Pittsburgh
History of Pittsburgh
Houses completed in 1886